Gualberto José Ibarreto Barrios (born July 12, 1947 in El Pilar, Sucre state, Venezuela), is a folk singer who plays the mandolin, cuatro, and guitar.

See also
 Venezuelan music

External links
 Gualberto Ibarreto Discography
 Gualberto Ibarreto Official Website
 

1947 births
Living people
People from Sucre (state)
Venezuelan folk singers